Part-Time Work of a Domestic Slave is a 1973 West German drama film directed by Alexander Kluge.

Plot
Roswitha Bronski (Alexandra Kluge) is a nurse married to the chemical engineer Franz Bronski (Bion Steinborn), with whom she had three children. Since her husband does not work, devoting himself exclusively to studies with the intention of becoming a new genius of chemistry, Roswitha has to support her family by running an illegal abortion clinic. Facing the indifference of her husband, who believes that she is intellectually inferior, the open hostility of doctors like Dr. Genée (Traugott Buhre) and a harsh double journey, Roswitha receives a hard blow when her clinic is closed by police. From then on, she puts aside her passivity and begins a journey to redefine herself as mother, wife and working woman, part of a society threatened by an early globalization.

Cast
 Alexandra Kluge as Roswitha Bronski
 Bion Steinborn as Franz Bronski
 Sylvia Gartmann as Sylvia
 Traugott Buhre as Dr. Genée
 Ursula Dirichs as Ms. Willek
  as Factory security chief

External links
 

1973 films
Films directed by Alexander Kluge
1970s avant-garde and experimental films
German avant-garde and experimental films
West German films
1970s German-language films
1970s German films